Mount England is a conical-topped mountain,  high, rising immediately south of New Glacier in the northeast part of Gonville and Caius Range, in Victoria Land. It was discovered by the British National Antarctic Expedition, 1901–04, under Robert Falcon Scott, who named it for Royal Navy Lieutenant Rupert England of the Morning, relief ship to the expedition.

References 

Mountains of Victoria Land
Scott Coast